Markham Cobblestone Farmhouse and Barn Complex is a historic home  and barn complex located at Lima in Livingston County, New York. The home was constructed about 1832 and is a 2-story, three-bay cobblestone main block with a -story rear wing.  It was built in the late Federal / early Greek Revival style.  Also on the property are a full complement of outbuildings dating from the 19th and early 20th century, including three contributing barns, a shed, two silos, a well with pump, and the remains of a former barn.

It was listed on the National Register of Historic Places in 1989.

References

Houses on the National Register of Historic Places in New York (state)
Cobblestone architecture
Houses completed in 1832
Houses in Livingston County, New York
National Register of Historic Places in Livingston County, New York
Barns on the National Register of Historic Places in New York (state)